Faggala is a district of Cairo, Egypt near Ramesis Square. It has long been an important center for book publishing, perhaps the largest in the country. During the early 20th century it became a center for the film industry and the famous Studio Nasibian was located there.

It is also an important religious center for the Coptic Orthodox Church of Egypt.

References